Robert Patrick Murphy (born May 23, 1976) is an American economist. Murphy is Research Assistant Professor with the Free Market Institute at Texas Tech University. He has been affiliated with Laffer Associates, the Pacific Research Institute, the Institute for Energy Research (IER), the Independent Institute, the Ludwig von Mises Institute, and the Fraser Institute.

Education
Murphy received a BA in economics at Hillsdale College in 1998 and a Ph.D. in economics at New York University in 2003.

Career
Murphy is Research Assistant Professor with the Free Market Institute at Texas Tech University. He has been a visiting Assistant Professor at Hillsdale College, and a visiting scholar at New York University. He has been affiliated with Laffer Associates, the Pacific Research Institute, the Institute for Energy Research (IER) as the senior economist focusing on climate change, the Independent Institute, the Ludwig von Mises Institute, and the Fraser Institute in Canada. He is the president of Consulting By RPM. In September 2021 Murphy was ranked as the 11th most influential person in economics by Academic Influence which uses "artificial intelligence to measure impact by academics and institutions."

Murphy has written books such as Choice: Cooperation, Enterprise, and Human Action (Independent Institute, 2015), Primal Prescription with Doug McGuff, MD regarding healthcare in the United States, and Lessons for the Young Economist (Mises Institute 2010). He has written study guides to works of Ludwig von Mises and Murray Rothbard. Murphy authored the 2007 book The Politically Incorrect Guide to Capitalism. Murphy's book, The Politically Incorrect Guide to the Great Depression and the New Deal, published in 2009, blamed the Depression on government policies.

Additionally, Murphy has written for The Washington Times, Forbes and Barron's Magazine. Murphy's writings have also been published in The American Journal of Economics and Sociology, The Review of Austrian Economics, the Quarterly Journal of Austrian Economics and the Journal of Private Enterprise. He has written for The Freeman, The American Conservative, LewRockwell.com Townhall.com and Antiwar.com.

Murphy was ranked as the 14th most influential economist since 1990 by Academic Influence.

Erroneous inflation predictions
Murphy has been criticized by economists Brad DeLong and Paul Krugman for predicting that the quantitative easing practiced by the Federal Reserve in the late 2000s would create double-digit inflation and economic ruin by 2013, and notes that he lost the bet.

In 2013 Murphy challenged Krugman to a debate and unnamed supporters of Murphy promised to donate $100,000 to a charity if Krugman would debate Murphy on economic policy issues. A promotional website was established for the challenge. In response to a radio show caller, Krugman rejected the proposed debate, saying that the subject “is not something to be settled by public circuses" and added, "Why should I dignify that totally-wrong doctrine — that doctrine that's gotten everything wrong — by giving them a platform?", pointing to the erroneous inflation predictions.

Religious views
Murphy is a Christian, and has stated in his writings that "my ethical beliefs are informed by my Christian faith, and I am a firm believer in natural law".

Books
 Chaos Theory (2002) – Two essays on anarchocapitalism; one discussing the production of defense services, and the other describing the provision of private criminal and civil justice.
 The Politically Incorrect Guide to Capitalism (2007) – A volume in The Politically Incorrect Guide series published by Regnery Publishing.  
 The Politically Incorrect Guide to the Great Depression and the New Deal (2009).  
 How Privatized Banking Really Works – Integrating Austrian Economics with the Infinite Banking Concept (2010) co-written with L. Carlos Lara. 
 Lessons for the Young Economist (2010) – available at Mises.org Library and Mises.org wiki.  
 Economic Principles for Prosperity (2014). Fraser Institute. Co-authored with Jason Clemens, Milagros Palacios, and Niels Velduis.
 The Primal Prescription (2015) – Co-authored with Dough McGuff, MD. The authors utilize their expertise in economics and medicine to examine America's health care system.
 Choice: Cooperation, Enterprise, and Human Action (July 1, 2015 – A concise retelling of the magnum opus of Ludwig Von Mises, Human Action.

Notes

References

External links
 Robert P. Murphy website
 Robert P. Murphy at Contra Krugman (podcast)
 Robert P. Murphy at Institute for Energy Research: Profile
 Robert P. Murphy at Mises.org: Literature archives,  Daily Article archives, Faculty Spotlight Interview: Robert Murphy
 

1976 births
Living people
21st-century American economists
21st-century American historians
21st-century American male writers
21st-century American non-fiction writers
21st-century Christians
American anarcho-capitalists
American Christians
American columnists
American consultants
American economics writers
American libertarians
American male non-fiction writers
American political writers
Austrian School economists
Christian anarchists
Christian libertarians
Critics of neoconservatism
Economists from New York (state)
Hillsdale College alumni
Hillsdale College faculty
Historians from New York (state)
Libertarian economists
Libertarian historians
Libertarian theorists
Mackinac Center for Public Policy
Mises Institute people
New York University alumni
Non-interventionism
Scientists from New York City
Writers from New York City